There are several types of regions in Peru:
 Regions of Peru
 Regional Governments of Peru
 Former regions of Peru
 Natural regions of Peru